In biology, a monotypic taxon is a taxonomic group (taxon) that contains only one immediately subordinate taxon. A monotypic species is one that does not include subspecies or smaller, infraspecific taxa. In the case of genera, the term "unispecific" or "monospecific" is sometimes preferred. In botanical nomenclature, a monotypic genus is a genus in the special case where a genus and a single species are simultaneously described. In contrast, an oligotypic taxon contains more than one but only a very few subordinate taxa.

Examples
Just as the term monotypic is used to describe a taxon including only one subdivision, the contained taxon can also be referred to as monotypic within the higher-level taxon, e.g. a genus monotypic within a family. Some examples of monotypic groups are:

Plants
 In the order Amborellales, there is only one family, Amborellaceae and there is only one genus, Amborella, and in this genus there is only one species, namely Amborella trichopoda.
 The flowering plant Breonadia salicina is the only species in the monotypic genus Breonadia.
 The family Cephalotaceae includes only one genus, Cephalotus, and only one species, Cephalotus follicularis – the Albany pitcher plant.
 The division Ginkgophyta is monotypic, containing the single class Ginkgoopsida. This class is also monotypic, containing the single order Ginkgoales.
 Flowering plant Nandina domestica is the only species in the genus Nandina.
 It is today generally accepted that cannabis (Cannabis sativa) is a monospecific genus.

Animals
The madrone butterfly is the only species in the monotypic genus Eucheira. However, there are two subspecies of this butterfly, E. socialis socialis and E. socialis westwoodi, which means the species E. socialis is not monotypic.
Delphinapterus leucas or the beluga whale is the only member of its genus and lacks subspecies.
Dugong dugongis the only species in the monotypic genus Dugong.
Homo sapiens (humans) are monotypic, as they have too little genetic diversity to harbor any living subspecies.
The narwhal is a medium sized cetacean that is the only member of the monotypic genus Monodon.
The platypus is the only member of the monotypic genus Ornithorhynchus.
 Ozichthys albimaculosus, the cream-spotted cardinalfish, found in tropical Australia and southern New Guinea, is the type species of the monotypic genus Ozichthys.
 The bearded reedling is the only species in the monotypic genus Panurus, which is the only genus in the monotypic family Panuridae.

See also 

 Glossary of scientific naming
 Monophyly

References

External links 
 

 
Conservation biology
Speciation